Kugah (also Romanized as Kūgāh; also known as Kūgā-ye ‘Olyā) is a village in Zamkan Rural District, in the Central District of Salas-e Babajani County, Kermanshah Province, Iran. At the 2006 census, its population was 105, in 21 families.

References 

Populated places in Salas-e Babajani County